Minnesota State Highway 62 can refer to two distinct state highways in Minnesota.

Minnesota State Highway 62 (Murray–Cottonwood counties), the original Highway 62 in southwest Minnesota, an east-west route between the cities of Fulda and Windom since 1933.
Minnesota State Highway 62 (Hennepin-Dakota Counties), the Crosstown Highway, located in the Twin Cities area, which became a state highway in 1988.

References
Steve Riner (December 27, 2003). Details of Routes 51-75. Unofficial Minnesota Highways Page. Accessed August 26, 2004.